Robert Anderson Mowat, was a British judge and diplomat, serving in China and Japan.  His last position before retirement was as Judge of the British Court for Japan.

Early life
Mowat was born in 1843 in Edinburgh, Scotland, the only son of Joseph Mowat. He was educated in Edinburgh before attending London University, which nominated him for the Foreign Office exam.

Career
Mowat joined the British China Consular Service in 1864 as a student interpreter.  In 1866, he was appointed Acting Law Secretary of the British Supreme Court for China and Japan in Shanghai.  He was appointed to the substantive position in 1868.  In 1869 Mowat went on long leave to study for the bar and was admitted to the bar of the Inner Temple in 1871. In 1876, he was appointed "Deputy Chief Judge", while the Acting Judge of the court, Charles Wycliffe Goodwin was in Yokohama.  Due to Goodwin's ill-health and death, he held the position for most of the time until 1878 when a new Chief Judge, George French, arrived in Shanghai.  In 1878, he was appointed Assistant Judge and Registrar of the Court.

In 1891, Mowat was appointed Judge of the British Court for Japan based in Yokohama. Before leaving for Japan, he acted as both British Chief Justice and Consul-General in Shanghai for over half a year until the new Chief Justice and Consul General, Nicholas John Hannen could take up the posts.

In his position as Judge for Japan, Mowat tried (with a jury) Edith Carew for the murder of her husband in 1896 in Yokohama.  Soon after, he retired due to ill health and returned to England.

Death
Mowat died on 7 June 1925 in Hove.

Further reading
 , Vol. 1: ; Vol. 2: ; Vol. 3:

References

1843 births
1925 deaths
British Supreme Court for China judges
British diplomats in East Asia
19th-century British lawyers
British expatriates in China
British expatriates in Japan